The 1981 Transamerica Open, also known as the Pacific Coast Championships, was a men's tennis tournament played on indoor carpet courts at the Cow Palace in San Francisco, California in the United States. The event was part of the Super Series of the 1981 Volvo Grand Prix circuit. It was the 93rd edition of the tournament and was held from September 21 through September 27, 1981. Fifth-seeded Eliot Teltscher won the singles title and earned $32,000 first-prize money.

Finals

Singles
 Eliot Teltscher defeated  Brian Teacher 6–3, 7–6
 It was Teltscher's 2nd singles title of the year and the 6th of his career.

Doubles
 John McEnroe /  Peter Fleming defeated  Mark Edmondson /  Sherwood Stewart 7–6, 6–4

References

External links
 ITF tournament edition details

Transamerica Open
Pacific Coast International Open
Transamerica Open
Transamerica Open
Transamerica Open